Nicostratus  may refer to:

in fiction and mythology:

 Nicostratus (mythology), a son of Menelaos by Helen of Troy or a slavewoman

Persons with this name 
 Nicostratus (comic poet), son of Aristophanes, a poet of the Middle Comedy (4th century BC)
 Nicostratus of Rhodes, a Rhodian commander in the 2nd century BC, companion of Agesilochus
 Nicostratus of Acaia, strategos of the Achaean League in 198-187 BC
 A saint converted by Saint Sebastian (see Mark and Marcellian)
 One of the Four Crowned Martyrs, died ca. 304, feast day 8 November